Marc Dupré (born July 28, 1973) is a Canadian singer, songwriter and musician from Quebec.

Career
His first album release was Refaire le monde in 2005. It included "Tout près du bonheur" with Céline Dion. The song was written by Dion and a music video was also released that was shot in Nevada. At the first Gala Artis, held in Montreal on April 30, 2006, Céline Dion also performed the song with Dupré.

Dupré opened for Céline Dion in her "Taking Chances" tour in Montréal and the release of a second album Revenir à toi in 2008.

His third album Entre deux mondes also contained a duet with Dion in the track "Y'a pas de mots".

His fourth album was released in 2013 titled Nous sommes les mêmes earning him the Félix for "Best male artist of the year"during the "35e Gala L'ADISQ" on October 27, 2013. The title track was a great success in Quebec and earned him also the Félix for "Popular song of the year" during the same event. The album was certified gold in Quebec.

Dupré is also well known as a comedian who imitates other voices and had several comedy appearances at the Juste pour rire festival (known also as Just for Laughs in English) in Montreal.

He has also cooperated with other artists, including Marc-André Fortin, Marie-Pier Perreault, Wilfred Le Bouthillier, Annie Villeneuve, Marie-Ève Côté, Maxime McGraw, Jérôme Couture, Jean-Marc Couture and Olivier Dion.

In 2018, Dupré recorded and released a cover of Calum Scott's "You Are the Reason" as a duet with his daughter Stella.

In popular culture
In 2012, he produced the annual album of the Quebec popular reality television series Star Académie.

From 2013 to 2017, Dupré was one of the four judges of La Voix, the French Canadian version of The Voice. Through the years, he sat next to Marie-Mai, Jean-Pierre Ferland, Ariane Moffatt, Isabelle Boulay, Éric Lapointe, Louis-Jean Cormier, and Pierre Lapointe.

He was also, in 2016 and 2017, one of the three coaches of La Voix Junior, the French-Canadian version of The Voice Kids, along with Marie-Mai and Alex Nevsky.

In October 2017, Dupré announced his intention to take a break from La Voix, heading into its sixth season. He will also take a break from the kids' version, La Voix Junior. However, he will return to La Voix for its seventh season, in 2019.

In 2021 he was one of the panelists on Chanteurs masqués, the Quebec adaptation of the Masked Singer franchise.

Personal life
He has been married since 2000 to Anne-Marie Angélil, the daughter of René Angélil and Anne Renée, as well as stepdaughter of Celine Dion. They have 3 children.

Discography

Albums

Singles

References

External links
Marc Dupré: Official site

1973 births
Singers from Quebec
Living people
French-language singers of Canada
French Quebecers
21st-century Canadian male singers
Canadian rock singers
Canadian pop singers
Canadian singer-songwriters
Félix Award winners
Canadian male singer-songwriters